Rhaphiptera nodifera is a species of beetle in the family Cerambycidae. It was described by Audinet-Serville in 1835. It is known from Argentina, Paraguay and Brazil.

References

nodifera
Beetles described in 1835